Esku Mahalleh (also Romanized as Eskū Maḩalleh, Oskoo Mahalleh, Oskū Mahalīeh, and Oskū Maḩalleh; also known as Emāmzādeh ‘Abdollāh) is a village in Bala Khiyaban-e Litkuh Rural District, in the Central District of Amol County, Mazandaran Province, Iran. At the 2006 census, its population was 3,940, in 938 families.

References 

Populated places in Amol County